Tara Profitt is an American Paralympic table tennis player who won a silver medal at the 2011 Parapan American Games in the women's doubles alongside Pamela Fontaine and was fourth place during the women's singles at the same championships. Currently she attends Wright State University and is married to Clyde.

Profitt competed at the 2012 Summer Paralympics in London, United Kingdom, 28 years after her previous Paralympic appearance at the 1984 Games.

References

External links
 

Living people
American female table tennis players
Table tennis players at the 1984 Summer Paralympics
Table tennis players at the 2012 Summer Olympics
Year of birth missing (living people)
Medalists at the 2011 Parapan American Games
21st-century American women